BriSCA could refer to

 The British Stock Car Association, this organisation manages BriSCA Formula 1 Stock Cars racing in the UK.
 BriSCA F2 Limited, responsible for the organisation of the smaller BriSCA Formula 2 Stock Cars.

See also
 Brisca